Manuel de Blas Muñoz (born 12 April 1941) is a Spanish film, television, and stage actor.

Biography
Manuel de Blas was born in Badajoz in 1941. He spent his childhood in Córdoba and subsequently moved to Madrid to study political science. While attending college he enrolled in an acting school, making his debut in films in 1961 with a minor role in the film Rosa de Lima.

In 1967 on the set of Cita en Navarra he met American film actress Patty Shepard, whom he married in the same year. They went on to act in several films together and remained married for 46 years, until the death of the actress in January 2013.

During his career, he has starred in many films. In 2012 he obtained a role in the movie Paranormal Xperience 3D.

He is brother-in-law of  American soap opera actress Judith Chapman.

Selected filmography
 Goya, a Story of Solitude (1971)
 The Vampires Night Orgy (1972)
 The Girl from the Red Cabaret (1973)
 Watch Out, We're Mad! (1974)
El Vicio Y La Virtud (1975)
 El Internado (2007-2010)
 Uncharted (film) (2022)

References

External links
 

1941 births
Living people
Spanish male film actors
Spanish male stage actors
Spanish male television actors
20th-century Spanish male actors
21st-century Spanish male actors
People from Badajoz